Fissicrambus profanellus is a moth of the family Crambidae. It is found in the southern part of the United States (including Alabama, Florida, South Carolina and Texas), the Caribbean (including Jamaica and the Virgin Islands) and Central America (including Nicaragua).

The wingspan is about 23 mm.

External links
Bug Guide
Images
Moths of Jamaica
Insects of the Virgin Islands 
Pyralidea of Nicaragua

Crambini
Moths described in 1866
Moths of North America